Andrea Caputo (died March 1650) was a Roman Catholic prelate who served as Bishop of Lettere-Gragnano (1625–1650) and Titular Bishop of Constantia in Arabia (1622–1625).

Biography
Andrea Caputo was born in Naples, Italy. On 11 July 1622, Andrea Caputo was appointed during the papacy of Pope Gregory XV as Coadjutor Bishop of Lettere-Gragnano and Titular Bishop of Constantia in Arabia.
On 31 July 1622, he was consecrated bishop by Marco Antonio Gozzadini, Cardinal-Priest of Sant'Eusebio, with Baldassare Cagliares, Bishop of Malta, and Alessandro Bosco, Bishop of Carinola, serving as co-consecrators. 
In 1625, he succeeded to the bishopric of Lettere-Gragnano.
He served as Bishop of Lettere-Gragnano until his death in March 1650.

While bishop, he was the principal co-consecrator of Antonio Bonfiglioli, Bishop of Carinola (1622); and Giacinto Petroni, Bishop of Molfetta (1622).

See also 
Catholic Church in Italy

References

External links and additional sources
 (for Chronology of Bishops) 
 (for Chronology of Bishops)  
 (for Chronology of Bishops) 
 (for Chronology of Bishops)  

Year of birth missing
1650 deaths
17th-century Italian Roman Catholic bishops
Bishops appointed by Pope Gregory XV
17th-century Neapolitan people